Gamaliel Waldo Beaman (September 4, 1852 – May 7, 1937) was an American landscape painter active in New England, and is best known for his views of New Hampshire's White Mountains as well as his many paintings of Connecticut Valley and of Mt. Wachusett and Mt. Monadnock in north central Massachusetts and southern New Hampshire.

Beaman was born in Westminster, Massachusetts, and moved to Cambridge as a young man where he began his career as a landscape painter. He took drawing classes at the Lowell Institute. During his early twenties he traveled and painted in the White Mountains and in the Rocky Mountains of Colorado. In 1878 & 1879 he studied abroad in Paris and Pont Aven, France.  Upon his return, he established a studio on Tremont Street in Boston. During this period, he frequently traveled to Northfield, Massachusetts, where he painted in and around the Connecticut Valley. There he received commissions from evangelist Dwight Lyman Moody. It was there that he also met and  married Mary Priest Stearns on October 22, 1885. Mary died of consumption shortly after the birth of their second child, and in 1894 Beaman married his second wife, Eileen Marie Rand Sherman of North Adams, Massachusetts. Following their marriage, the artist and his wife maintained a residence and studio in Manchester-by-the-Sea, Massachusetts. In 1898 they returned to north central Massachusetts and purchased a home in Princeton, Massachusetts. In addition to being an accomplished artist he was a recognized antiquarian who in his latter years was known as "Antique Beaman."

Beaman exhibited at the Boston Art Club from 1877 to 1882, at the Museum of Fine Arts, Boston in 1883, and at the Pennsylvania Academy of the Fine Arts in 1881, 1884, and 1885. He exhibited widely in many industrial exhibits including those sponsored by the New England Manufacturers' and Mechanics' Institute and the Massachusetts Charitable Mechanic Association. One of his paintings was included in the World Industrial and Cotton Centennial Exposition in 1884. His work is listed in the archives of the Smithsonian Museum of American Art in Washington, D.C. His paintings are in the collections of several university art museums including the Hood Art Museum of Dartmouth College in Hanover, New Hampshire. Many of his paintings may be viewed in the collections of Northfield, Princeton, and Westminster, Massachusetts public libraries and historical societies. The vast majority of his work. estimated to be between three and four hundred paintings, reside in private collections throughout the United States.

References 
 Smithsonian Libraries entry
 Find-a-Grave article
 AskArt article
 White Mountain Art article
 Questroyal Fine Art article
 Genealogy of the Descendants of John White of Wenham and Lancaster, Massachusetts, Almira Larkin White, Chase Brothers, printers, 1900, page 416.

American painters
1852 births
1937 deaths
People from Westminster, Massachusetts
Painters from Massachusetts